USS Virginia may refer to:

 , was a 28-gun sailing frigate built in 1776, captured by the British in the following year and recommissioned as HMS Virginia
 , was a 14-gun revenue cutter built in 1797 and returned to the Revenue Cutter Service in 1801
 , was a 74-gun ship of the line laid down in 1818 but never launched, and broken up on the stocks in 1874
 , was a captured Spanish blockade runner during the American Civil War and commissioned into the Union Navy
 , was a  commissioned in 1906, decommissioned in 1920, and destroyed in 1923 as a bombing target
 , was a yacht purchased by the Navy and officially referred to only as SP-274, patrolled Lake Michigan during World War I
 , was a motorboat acquired by the Navy and officially referred to only as SP-746, patrolled the east coast during World War I
 , was a two-masted auxiliary schooner acquired by the Navy and officially referred to only as SP-1965, patrolled the east coast during World War I
 , was a  commissioned in 1976 and decommissioned in 1994
 , is a  commissioned in 2004

See also
 Virginia (ship)
 CSS Virginia was the first Confederate ironclad, built using the hull of the captured USS Merrimack
 USS Merrimack (1855), the ship that CSS Virginia was built upon
 CSS Virginia II, an ironclad ram.
  for ships of the US Revenue Cutter Service
 
 
 Virginia (disambiguation)

United States Navy ship names